The Arizona pocket mouse (Perognathus amplus) is a rodent native to the Sonoran desert. It is a small mouse with a thinly furred tail that is smooth from base to tip (i.e. it has no tuft). In color it ranges from tan to orange.  It is a nocturnal, burrowing animal.  It eats seeds, which it carries back to its burrow in its cheek pouches.

References

External links
 Heteromyidae: Kangaroo Rats & Pocket Mice from the Arizona-Sonoran Desert Museum

Perognathus
Mouse, Arizona Pocket
Mouse, Arizona Pocket
Mammals described in 1900